BrokerChooser is a global comparison website for online brokerages, digital banks and robo-advisors established and headquartered in Birkirkara, Malta. BrokerChooser provides brokerage reviews, ratings, and broker comparison tools.

BrokerChooser also offers educational materials for beginner and more advanced investors such as articles on basic financial products and services, and various tools that help investors choose the brokerage that best fits their needs.

History

2016-2020 
BrokerChooser was founded in 2016 by Gergely Korpos and Tibor Bedo. Prior to starting BrokerChooser, Korpos was working as a portfolio manager at CIG Asset Management and Bedo was a consultant at The Boston Consulting Group. Both founders attended Corvinus University of Budapest where they became friends. This friendship became the future foundation of BrokerChooser.

At BrokerChooser, Korpos is responsible for product development while Bedo is in charge of general business management.

The idea of BrokerChooser emerged from a fruitless Google search for a brokerage comparison website. And they failed to find such a platform, Korpos and Bedo decided to build their own site for comparing brokers from scratch. A few months later they joined InnovationsLab, the startup incubator program of the Central European University, where within three years they became one of the most successful teams.

In its first four years of operation, BrokerChooser grew exponentially both in terms of site visitors and revenue. The one-million-euro revenue milestone was reached in 2020.

Even though the founders have received several serious buyout offers over the years, they chose to grow and scale their business on their own, without any external funding.

2021- 
Since 2021, BrokerChooser has started to appear more frequently in the global media as an industry expert, providing opinions, comments or analyses for outlets like the Financial Times, The Wall Street Journal, Bloomberg and The New York Times. The shift towards a bigger media presence was facilitated by the GameStop short squeeze in January 2021.

References 

Websites